This is a list of fictional towns and villages in film limited to notable examples.

References

Lists of fictional populated places
Towns

Regarding the fictional town of Springwood, U.S.A. of the "Nightmare on Elm Street" films and TV series, there actually exists a Springwood located in New South Wales, Australia.
Source: https://en.wikipedia.org/wiki/Springwood,_New_South_Wales